The Blockade of Cebu was a failed Portuguese naval action against the Spanish colony in the present-day city of Cebu, Philippines in 1568. The Portuguese fleet under captain-general Gonzalo Pereira blockaded Cebu in an effort to starve and expel the Spanish. However, the Spanish colony proved to be resistant to the blockade and the Portuguese fleet eventually suffered from typhoid fever. Pereira then decided to lift the blockade and sail the fleet to the Maluku Islands.

Background
In 1494, the Treaty of Tordesillas divided the lands outside of Europe in half between Spain and Portugal. The Spanish obtained the Americas (except Brazil) and the Pacific while the Portuguese acquired Africa and parts of Asia. However, the Philippines was not mentioned in the treaty. The Spanish originally ignored the islands because it was well west of their supposed claims.

Charles V, monarch of Spain and the Holy Roman Empire, authorized an expedition by Ferdinand Magellan who was known to have made the first circumnavigation of the world. The objective of the expedition was to find an alternative route to Asia. Magellan was ultimately killed during the Battle of Mactan in 1521.

It was during the reign of Charles's son, Phillip II, that Spain decided to colonize the Philippines thinking that Portugal would not protest as the islands was not abundant in spices. An expedition led by Miguel López de Legazpi successfully established in 1565 a Spanish colonial settlement in Cebu. When King Sebastian of Portugal learned of Legazpi's colony, he sent captain-general Gonzalo Pereira to expel the Spanish.

Blockade
On September 18, 1568, a Portuguese vessel arrived in Cebu with letters from Pereira announcing his imminent arrival. Ten days later, a fleet manned by Portuguese and Moluccan sailors appeared on the horizon. Pereira sent messages to Legazpi asserting that the islands lay on their side of the demarcation line that then divided the globe between Spain and Portugal. The Portuguese threatened to attack if the Spanish did not abandon their colony but Legazpi refused their demands. The last communication between Legazpi and Pereira was on October 31. Faced with the risk of being blamed for conflict, Pereira decided to blockade Cebu instead of directly attacking it.

During the following months, the Portuguese ships fired upon neighboring villages and killed native inhabitants, including women and children. When it became clear that the Spanish would not leave the Philippines and with the Portuguese fleet suffering from a typhoid epidemic, Pereira lifted the blockade on New Year's Day in 1569 and sailed to the Maluku Islands.

Aftermath
After the Portuguese blockade, Legazpi held a general meeting of officers and priests. It was decided that a second Spanish settlement should be established in Panay due to its plentiful food supply and several outlets to the sea. There the Spanish would later found what is present-day Roxas City on the bank of the Panay River in 1569.

Legazpi would subsequently transfer the colonial government to Manila, which he proclaimed to be the new capital of the Spanish East Indies in 1571.

References

History of the Philippines (1565–1898)
Military history of the Philippines
History of Cebu City